Ikeda Sen (池田せん) or Annyo-in (若御前) was a late-Sengoku period onna-musha. She was the daughter of Ikeda Tsuneoki and the older sister of Ikeda Terumasa. Mori Nagayoshi (older brother of Mori Ranmaru) was her first husband. She was a woman trained in martial arts and was commander of a unit that consisted of 200 female musketeers (Teppō unit)

Despite having little historical record about her life, Ikeda Sen is described as a female samurai who participated in notable military campaigns and received 10,000 koku, being a female lord or a possible daimyo.

Early life 
Sen (せん) was born in Owari province, as the second child of Ikeda Tsuneoki, a vassal of the Oda clan. Her older brother Motosuke Ikeda was born in 1559, and her younger brother Terumasa was born in 1565, so by that reasoning, we can assume Ikeda Sen was born around 1563.

Genealogy 

Ikeda Sen's grandmother, Yōtoku-in (養徳院), was the wet nurse (foster mother) of Oda Nobunaga, a major daimyo. Yōtoku-in's position as Nobunaga's foster mother, exacerbated the wealth of the Ikeda clan and its political influence.

Sen's father, Ikeda Tsuneoki, served Oda Nobuhide, Oda Nobunaga, and Toyotomi Hideyoshi. He was one of the elders of Kiyosu Castle, and later became the lord of Inuyama and Ogaki Castles. Her younger brother, Ikeda Terumasa would become the lord of Yoshida Castle in Mikawa province.

Sen's brother, Terumasa, was offered a powerful political marriage, he married Tokugawa Tokuhime, the daughter of Tokugawa Ieyasu, and would become known as the '' Shogun of the West '' after building the remaining Himeji castle.

Ikeda Sen's first husband, Mori Nagayoshi, was also a famous samurai serving the Oda family. Nagayoshi served the Oda shortly after inheriting the Mori clan and became famous for his monstrous strength and ferocity. His reputation with his fellow retainers varies between a foul mannered ruffian to a man of refined penmanship. His younger brother was Nobunaga's closest page and possible love interest, Mori Ranmaru.

Biography 

Ikeda Sen served the Oda clan alongside her entire family. She was involved with so many powerful figures at the time that it is presumed that she was in a high position in Japanese society. Receiving a noble education, she was skilled in Naginata-do, a martial art disseminated by Japanese women from the Samurai family, as a weapon that could be used to protect their homes in times of war. Her differential among other women was that Sen was trained with firearms, something quite unusual for men and especially women of the time. Teppō unit (musketeers) targeted more powerful armies, as many of the firearms were produced in the Western and exported to Japan.

Battle of Yamazaki 

In 1582, Akechi Mitsuhide, a proeminent retainer of Oda clan, was ordered to march west and assist Hashiba Hideyoshi who was at that time fighting the Mōri clan. Ignoring Nobunaga's orders, Mitsuhide assembled an army of 13,000 soldiers and moved against Nobunaga's position at Honnō-ji. On June 21, Mitsuhide was quoted as saying, "The enemy is at Honnō-ji!" His army surrounded the temple and eventually set it on fire. Oda Nobunaga was killed either during the fighting, or by his own hand. Nobunaga's son, Oda Nobutada, fled the scene, but was surrounded at Nijō and killed.

In 1582, Ikeda clan took part in Hashiba Hideyoshi's force at the Battle of Yamazaki after the Incident at Honnō-ji, helping defeat Akechi Mitsuhide, who killed Sen's former lord, Oda Nobunaga. After killing Mitsuhide, the Ikeda clan begins to serve Hideyoshi. Ikeda Sen volunteered for the army of the Hashiba (Toyotomi clan), there is no concrete evidence that she participated in the battle, but there are anecdotes that she led a unit of Teppō, or Musketeer's unit. The veracity of these facts remains unknown, but not improbable due to the Ikeda clan being one of the main leaders of the campaign against Akechi Mitsuhide.

Battle of Shizugatake 

At a meeting in Kiyosu to decide on Nobunaga's successor. On the one hand, the general in chief of the Oda Clan, Shibata Katsuie, supported Oda Nobutaka as his country's successor. On the other, Hideyoshi decided to support Nobunaga's youngest son, Oda Hidenobu. After gaining the support of the other two elders of the Oda Clan, Niwa Nagahide and Ikeda Tsuneoki, Hideyoshi strengthened Hidenobu's position and at the same time increased his influence within the Clan.

The Ikeda clan's decision to support Hidenobu quickly increased tension between Katsuie and Hideyoshi, starting the Battle of Shizugatake the following year. In the Battle of Shizugatake (1583), Ikeda Sen fought with her Teppō unit along with Oda Nobukatsu in the Gifu Castle defended by Oda Nobutaka. After Shibata Katsuie committed suicide with his wife Oichi (Nobunaga's sister) in Kitanosho Castle, Oda Nobutaka surrenders. After which Hideyoshi defeated Shibata and thus consolidated his own power, absorbing most of the Oda clan for his control. Because of this, the position of the Ikeda clan has increased further, leading Sen to enjoy the most privileged class of women.

Battle of Komaki and Nagakute 

After winning the battle, Hideyoshi invited Nobukatsu and other generals to his residence at Osaka Castle. The meaning of this invitation was for all men to pay homage to Hideyoshi, which would reverse the roles between Hideyoshi and Nobukatsu. Therefore, Nobukatsu broke his ties with Hideyoshi and did not go to Osaka Castle. Nobukatsu ordered them to kill their three main retainers on suspicion that they were planning to serve Hideyoshi. These actions gave Hideyoshi the justification for attacking Nobukatsu and, as a result, Nobukatsu asked Ieyasu for auxiliary forces. The next day, when Ieyasu sent his forces into battle, it became a battle between Hideyoshi and Ieyasu.

In May 1584, during the battle of Komaki Nagakute, Ikeda Tsuneoki offered a plan to Toyotomi Hideyoshi, suggesting that the Toyotomi army attacked Okazaki castle (Ieyasu's residence). Since Ieyasu was marching with his army to several castles loyal to Hideyoshi, Ikeda assumed that there were few soldiers in Okazaki. The plan was adopted, and Ikeda's army began to move silently so that its movements were not noticed, but Ieyasu's army discovered the conspiracy and pursued it. In the vicinity of the current Nagakute Battle Museum today, Ikeda Tsuneoki and his army of 6,000 soldiers set up a war camp. There, Ieyasu's army enveloped them and the Battle of Nagakute broke out.

Ikeda Sen, who was about 20 or 21, was said to have commanded a squad of about 200 women. She joined with Tsuneoki, Nagayoshi, and Terumasa in fighting for Toyotomi Hideyoshi in the Battle of Komaki and Nagakute. Her father and her husband died during the battle, her brother Ikeda Terumasa survived, succeeding Tsuneoki as leader of the Ikeda clan.

Later records 

After Nagayoshi's death, Sen married one of the three main members of the Toyotomi government, daimyo Nakamura Kazuuji, who was born in Nakamura-ku, Nagoya. During her marriage, Sen gave birth to two children. Her most notable son was Nakamura Kazutada, the first lord who ruled the Yonago Domain. Kazutada married Ieyasu's adopted daughter, further strengthening the relations between the Ikeda clan and the Tokugawa clan even more. Sen's husband, Nakamura Kazuuji, died in August 1600, just before the Battle of Sekigahara. 

After the death of her second husband, she became a Buddhist nun, changing her name to Annyo-in (若 御前). Possibly she returned to the domains of the Ikeda clan after Kazuuji's death, but there is evidence that she remained in the Nakamura clan.

When the Sekigahara Campaign began in the fall of 1600, Sen's brother and Sen's son immediately sided with Tokugawa. There is no evidence, but according to various sources, Ikeda Sen is said to have led her squad of women musketeers in other battles in which the Ikeda family participated, including the Battle of Yamazaki and the Battle of Sekigahara. If the speculation that she was present in the Sekigahara Campaign is true, she probably participated in the Battle of Gifu Castle alongside her brother and Fukushima Masanori.

According to Edo's initial manuscript, ''Tōdaiki'' (当代記) or "The Present Chronicles", which recorded income from the rice wages of several warriors, Ikeda Sen received 10,000 koku. She had land in her own right, her fiefdoms with a recipe equivalent to 10,000 koku, it is considerably high for a warrior, making Sen a possible daimyo. Because there is little detail about this, Ikeda Sen's life and fate is uncertain.

Sen survived the entire Period of Warring States, dying in 17th-century. It is speculated that she lived for more than 80 years, due to the last records of her life being written around 1640, records written in the historiographies of Matsudaira Tadaaki.

In popular culture 

 Ikeda Sen appears in the Tecmo Koei video game Samurai Warriors 4 Empires and Nobunaga's Ambition.

See also 

 List of female castellans in Japan

References 

16th-century Japanese women
Ikeda clan
Japanese women in warfare
Women in 16th-century warfare
Women in 17th-century warfare